You Deserve Everything is a 2016 Australian short film written and directed by Goran Stolevski and starring Sachin Joab and Jean Bachoura.

Premise 
A doctor's tentative romance with the hospital's Arabic interpreter is evolving into something deeper. But everything is not as it seems.

Cast
Sachin Joab as Doctor Edward
Jean Bachoura as Sami

Awards and official selections
 Official Selection - Sydney Film Festival
 Official Selection - San Francisco International LGBT Film Festival
 Official Selection - Melbourne International Film Festival
 Official Selection - Vancouver Queer Film Festival

See also
 Cinema of Australia

References

External links 
 

2016 films
2016 independent films
2016 romance films
Australian independent films
Australian drama short films
2010s English-language films
2016 short films
2016 LGBT-related films
Australian LGBT-related films
LGBT-related short films
Films directed by Goran Stolevski
2010s Australian films